Tomb Raider II is a 1997 action-adventure video game developed by Core Design and published by Eidos Interactive. It was first released on Windows and PlayStation. Later releases came for Mac OS (1998), iOS (2014) and Android (2015). It is the second entry in the Tomb Raider series, and follows archaeologist-adventurer Lara Croft hunting the magical Dagger of Xian, which is also hunted by an Italian cult. Gameplay features Lara navigating levels split into multiple areas and room complexes while fighting enemies and solving puzzles to progress, with some areas allowing for or requiring the use of vehicles. An expansion pack subtitled The Golden Mask was released the following year, containing new levels focused on Lara's quest to find a golden mask in Alaska.

Production began in 1996 immediately after the success of the original Tomb Raider, being completed in between six and eight months, a short development period which was physically and emotionally stressful for the team. Original staff members Toby Gard and Paul Douglas left over creative differences with the publisher, though many remained including composer Nathan McCree. A Sega Saturn version was scrapped due to both hardware limitations and a console exclusivity deal signed between Eidos and Sony. Critics praised the game at release, with many noting its expanded gameplay and smoother graphics. It went on to sell nearly seven million copies worldwide. A sequel, Tomb Raider III, was released in 1998.

Gameplay

Tomb Raider II is an action-adventure video game in which the player assumes the role of archaeologist-adventurer Lara Croft, exploring a series of locations including ruins and tombs in search of ancient artefacts. The game is split into levels: the Great Wall of China, Venice, an oil rig and shipwreck in an unspecified ocean area, and the foothills of Tibet. Lara's home of Croft Manor can be accessed from the start menu as a training area, and is used in the final level.

Much of the gameplay is carried over from the original Tomb Raider. The game is presented in a third person perspective focused on Lara, with levels and movement built around a grid-based system, with Lara's movement built around tank controls. Progress is based on puzzles revolving around finding keys and completing platforming sections, avoiding traps and environmental hazards in the process. Lara can run, walk (which prevents her from falling off ledges), look around areas, jump forwards and backwards, shimmy along ledges, roll, swim through bodies of water, and move blocks. In addition, Lara is able to walk through shallow water, use flares to light dark areas, climb ladders and other designated surfaces, turn 180 degrees while jumping or swimming, and during the Venice and Tibet levels drive a speedboat and snowmobile respectively. Zip lines in some areas can be used to traverse large gaps, and flares can be used to light dark areas for a limited time.

By default in combat, Lara uses two pistols with infinite ammo, with her unable to perform actions aside from jumping and rolling while her weapons are drawn. Supplementary weapons with limited ammunition can be found during the game; these are a shotgun, dual automatic pistols, dual Uzis, an M16 rifle, a grenade launcher, and a harpoon gun used in underwater combat. In some urban areas, windows can be shot out to create new routes. During exploration, Lara can find supplies such as medipacks which heal damage, flares and ammunition for weapons both from defeated enemies, and around the environment. Each level contains three secret collectables−a silver, jade and gold dragon−which reward supply cashes and sometimes weapons when all three are collected. Players can perform saves anywhere in-game. If Lara is killed, the player must restart from a previous save.

Plot
Lara Croft is searching for the Dagger of Xian, a magical weapon once used by an ancient Emperor of China to command his army; by plunging the weapon into its owner's heart, the weapon has the power to turn its bearer into a dragon. Having tracked the Dagger's chamber to beneath the Great Wall of China, Lara is accosted by a member of the Fiamma Nera, an Italian cult obsessed with the Dagger. Before killing himself, the cultist reveals that his master Marco Bartoli seeks the Dagger, and she tracks the Fiamma Nera to an abandoned opera house in Venice. Stowing away aboard a plane leaving Venice with Marco on board, Lara overhears Marco discussing the Seraph, an object key to retrieving the key to the Dagger's chamber that was with his father Gianni when his luxury liner Maria Doria was bombed and sunk.

Lara is found on the plane and captured, being imprisoned in a repurposed oil rig above the Maria Doria ship. Lara escapes and encounters a monk of the Barkhang Monastery in Tibet, who originally defeated the Emperor and sealed the Dagger away. The monk was there to prevent Marco from salvaging the Seraph. Marco kills the monk, and Lara narrowly escapes and dives alongside a submersible to discover the shipwreck, and searching throughout the remains she eventually retrieves the Seraph. Using the plane, she heads for Tibet and reaches the Barkhang Monastery, which is under siege from the Fiamma Nera. Using the Seraph, she opens the way to retrieve the key to the Dagger's chamber, killing its monstrous guardian in the process. Escaping the Fiamma Nera, she unlocks the Dagger's chamber, but is plunged into the catacombs beneath before she can reach it.

Making her way back, she witnesses Bartoli stabbing himself with the Dagger and being carried through a portal by his cultists. Following them through, Lara navigates a magical space of jade islands and animated statues, finally confronting Bartoli as he transforms into a dragon. Lara renders the dragon unconscious and pulls the dagger from Bartoli's heart, killing him and escaping back into the real world just as the area starts to collapse, causing part of the Wall to explode in the process. The Fiamma Nera launch a final unsuccessful attack against Lara at Croft Manor; the final scene is Lara about to disrobe for a shower, then breaking the fourth wall as she shoots at the camera.

Development
Upon its release in 1996, Tomb Raider was a huge critical and commercial success for developer Core Design and publisher Eidos Interactive. According to one report, a sequel was being planned two months before the original was released. Co-designer Heather Gibson called the prospect of not making a sequel "unthinkable" given the work done on the original and its commercial success. Due to creative differences surrounding Lara's portrayal and the decision to make a sequel rather than an entirely new game, her credited creator Toby Gard left the company alongside designer Paul Douglas, prompting mixed feelings from the other team members. Programmer Gavin Rummery had been working with Gard and Douglas on a planned original title, but disagreed with their attitude towards the heads of Core Design and rejoined the Tomb Raider team shortly before Gard and Douglas left.

The production schedule, estimated at between six and eight months, was extremely taxing for the team both physically and emotionally, with team members later describing the entire production as a prolonged crunch period. Rummery described its production as "insane". Alongside Rummery and Gibson, co-designer Neal Boyd, producer Troy Horton, writer Vicky Arnold, and composer Nathan McCree also remained. The team was also expanded so the game could be produced in time; among them was future designer Andy Sandham, transferred over from production of Fighting Force 2 to work on the CGI cutscenes. Also new to the team were animators Stewart Atkinson and Joss Charmet. A team of six playtesters worked on the game throughout production right until it was sent for Sony's approval, playing through the game repeatedly to pick up bugs.

Tomb Raider II was originally planned for PlayStation, Windows and Sega Saturn, the same platforms as the original. Core Design had been planning for a Saturn version of Tomb Raider II to use the 3D accelerator cartridge designed for the Saturn conversion of Virtua Fighter 3; this cartridge was cancelled before Tomb Raider II was completed. The Saturn version was officially cancelled in mid-1997, with Core Design staff member Adrian Smith citing technical limitations of the console to program an adequate conversion. It was reported that the more detailed 3D graphics of Tomb Raider II were too much for the Saturn hardware to handle, as the original game was already known to perform worse than other versions. In September 1997, Eidos signed a deal with Sony, making the console versions of Tomb Raider exclusive to the PlayStation until the year 2000. The Windows version was built for the Windows 95 system. The team described the two versions as having few differences beyond their graphics; the Windows version allowed for high resolution display, while the PlayStation version used "neat transparencies and other effects".

Lara's appearance in Tomb Raider II was given a make-over by Atkinson. The number of polygons used for her character model was increased, adding more realistic curves to its design, and giving her more outfits for different levels. Core Design producer Andrew Thompson estimated that her character model used double the number of polygons. She was also given a free-flowing ponytail to make her more realistic. While Gard had been unwilling to populate the game with human enemies, Tomb Raider II put a greater focus on combat with armed human opponents, alongside a greater variety of animal and supernatural enemies. This was also done in response to player complaints about a lack of combat in the original. The final shower scene, with Lara breaking the fourth wall, was a response from Core Design to the notorious "Nude Raider" fan patch. They similarly included a secret code that blew Lara up rather than its rumoured function of stripping Lara.

While the higher combat meant there was more focus on action, Smith noted that the exploration that was a focus of the first game remained important. There were also more boss-like battles compared to the original, and the enemy AI was improved so they could pursue her onto raised platforms. Rather than starting over from scratch, the team used the same engine as the first game, focusing on tweaking and including new features such as climbing and wading. Adding in all the new elements, both graphical and gameplay-related, was described as challenging as the team wanted the game to be seen as its own game more than a sequel. Grenades were originally planned for the first game, but were not finished in time for release, so were included in Tomb Raider II.

A new level editor tool was designed so areas could be put together quickly, speeding up the level creation and allowing for quick detection of bugs. There was a greater variety of level environments created, including a number of outdoor areas. The in-game camera was also adjusted to correct awkward camera angles that could occur in the original. Tomb Raider II was described as similar in length to the first game, but with more detailed environments and expanded gameplay elements. Atkinson attributed the inclusion of vehicles as his suggestion. Three proposed actions that did not make it into the final game were crawling through narrow spaces, swinging on ropes, and a "hand-over-hand" gymnastics move with an unspecified application. Planned section riding a motorbike and a horse had to be cut. The game was to have ended with the dragon battle, but this was felt to be anticlimactic, so an epilogue level was added. Due to time constraints, the team set the epilogue in the existing Croft Manor level.

Audio
McCree was allotted much more time to score the game than he was with the original Tomb Raider, allowing him to not only write twice as many tunes, but also plan out ahead of time how his music would be used in the game and generally become more directly involved in the game's development. He worked on the game's music and sound with sound designer Matt Kemp. McCree enjoyed finding ways of arranging the main theme, with its simplicity making variations after the first game easy. One of the pieces he remembered fondly was "Venice"; describing it as "an exercise in stylistic writing", he wrote it to sound like a piece of Baroque music such as Antonio Vivaldi and Johann Sebastian Bach, with the major challenge being to make the violins sound real. He spent three months working on the score for Tomb Raider II. McCree and Kemp later called their work on the game stressful due to not knowing the space they had available, and needing to cut and rearrange the music and sound up to the last minute. The team considered incorporating interactive MIDI sampling, but discarded the idea due to poor sound quality.

While Lara's original voice actress Shelley Blond was offered the chance to reprise her role, she was unable to do so due to other commitments, but she gave permission for her effort noises to be kept. Judith Gibbins became the new voice of Lara. Gibbens, who had worked in amateur dramatics, was recommended to audition by her brother Martin Gibbens worked at Core Design. Her role in the game was kept a secret, though she did confide in her son. The secrecy was part of the marketing strategy that Eidos was employing to make Lara seem like a real person. Voice recording took place in London and lasted months due to the need to re-record due to frequent script changes. She would voice the character only once more in the following game.

Release
Tomb Raider II was announced early in 1997. An early demo based on the game's alpha version, later leaked online, was shown at E3. Beginning in October, Eidos launched what was described as a "multi-media dollar" extensive marketing campaign including radio commercials, print and television ads, cross promotion with MTV and the drink brand Pepsi, and a direct mail campaign. The push ran parallel to an increased media presence for Lara as a character. The exclusivity deal with Sony meant that extra funding was made available for the game's marketing, alongside making the Tomb Raider series an icon for the console. Due to the deadline pressure, PlayStation demo discs were mistakenly sent to Sony with expired copy-protection timers, making them unplayable. After Sony "went nuclear", Core Design quickly created a fix and recalled the discs.

Both versions of the game were released in North America and Europe on 24 November 1997. The PlayStation version was published in Japan by Victor Interactive Software on 22 January 1998. A version for Mac OS was developed by Westlake Interactive and published by Aspyr in North America in October 1998. Tomb Raider II was made available for download for the PlayStation 3 via the PlayStation Network store on 7 September 2012. The game was released for Mac OS X and sold via the Mac App Store in October 2011. The PC version was re-released digitally in 2012 by GOG.com. A version for IOS was published by then franchise owner Square Enix on 3 December 2014. This version was released for Android the following year on 28 October.

The Golden Mask

An additional set of four levels, alternately called Tomb Raider II Gold and Tomb Raider II: The Golden Mask, began release in 1999. The story follows Lara exploring a hidden realm in Alaska in search of a magical golden mask. The levels were first released as downloadable content through the game's website starting in April 1999. The full version was released as an expansion pack alongside a reissue of the main game on 30 May. The levels were offered for both versions as a free download for those who already owned Tomb Raider II. While the levels were original, they were built using the existing engine and technology of Tomb Raider II. Phil Campbell, designer of the Gold editions of the Tomb Raider games, noted that the levels and stories were designed based around references more than having any connection to the main game. The level set was originally going to have an opening cutscene introducing the narrative. Lara was originally given a more revealing leopard skin jumpsuit outfit for the level "Nightmare in Vegas", but was vetoed by Eidos and Core Design as not fitting the character. Another dropped concept for the level was having the scenery mostly in black and white, and human enemies being different versions of Elvis Presley. While released for the Mac in January 2000 and included in the mobile ports, several re-releases of Tomb Raider II excluded The Golden Mask due to licencing issues.

Reception

Tomb Raider II received positive reviews from most critics. At Metacritic, which assigns a weighted average rating out of 100, the game received a score of 85 for the PlayStation version based on 13 reviews, which indicates "favourable reviews". The majority commented that while the differences from the original game are relatively small, Tomb Raider was a strong enough game that these differences and the consistent execution were enough to make an outstanding game. Next Generation, for example, stated that despite its forced development and having little additions in the game, the magazine felt the second game was superior to the original. Glenn Rubenstein was one of the few to disagree, writing in GameSpot that the improvements were cosmetic. He opined that both installments of the series to date are uninspired games which sold largely on the stardom of Lara Croft. IGNs Adam Douglas concluded that compared to its predecessor, the second game is inferior to the original despite being entertaining. Crispin Boyer of Electronic Gaming Monthly drew the comparison even more favourably, considering Tomb Raider II a superior game.

Among the changes the sequel made, the ones which received the most positive mentions were the addition of vehicles and the ability to climb walls. Many critics also compared the game's massive length favourably to that of the original Tomb Raider. Both GameSpots Tim Soete and GamePro highly praised the timed traps, saying they induce a greater sense of panic and engagement than the traps in the original Tomb Raider. Rubenstein, despite his generally negative assessment of the game, agreed with Douglas that the greater number of human opponents in the sequel was a welcome improvement. An overwhelming majority of critics described Tomb Raider II as extremely difficult right from the beginning levels, with Next Generation stating that Core had clearly designed it with players who had completed the original Tomb Raider in mind. GamePro likewise described it as "for experts", but suggested that novices could learn the game given a good amount of patience and practice.

The graphics received more criticism than other aspects of the game; both Rubenstein and Electronic Gaming Monthlys Shawn Smith noted that the environmental graphics are rough, but added that this was both understandable and relatively unimportant given the enormous size of the levels. Soete and Next Generation also praised the huge levels, with Soete commenting that Lara is exaggeratedly dwarfed in her surroundings, scaling the enormous walls of a gangster hideout's vestibule during one adventure, swinging from balcony to balcony in a surrealistically proportioned opera house during another. Macworlds Michael Gowan wrote that while gunplay is involved, the exploration and problem solving keep the players riveted for hours and also praised the graphics. GamePro gave Tomb Raider II a 4.0 out of 5 for control and a perfect 5.0 for sound, fun factor, and graphics, applauding the controls, onslaught of threats, character animation, cinematic cutscenes, and intelligent use of sound effects and music.

Electronic Gaming Monthly named it "Adventure Game of the Year" at their 1997 Editors' Choice Awards, citing its unmatched variety of challenges and experiences.

Sales
In August 1998, Tomb Raider IIs computer and PlayStation releases each received a "Platinum" sales award from the Verband der Unterhaltungssoftware Deutschland (VUD), given to games with at least 200,000 sales across Germany, Austria and Switzerland. Sales of its computer version totaled 137,000 units in the German market between January and September 1998 alone, which made it the region's third-best-selling computer game during that period. It ultimately became the German market's fifth-best-selling computer game of 1998 as a whole. Tomb Raider IIs PlayStation version sold 221,000 units and was the German market's third-biggest console title across all systems over the same timeframe. At the 1999 Milia festival in Cannes, Tomb Raider II took home a "Gold" prize for revenues above €39 million in the European Union during the previous year. The game has sold 6.8 million copies worldwide as of 2009, and was the second overall best selling PlayStation title in the UK.

Sequel

Following Tomb Raider and Tomb Raider II, the Core Design team wanted two years to properly evolve the series game design, but the company was committed by Eidos to delivering a new Tomb Raider title annually to meet consumer demand, which caused several team members to attempt quitting. To compromise, Heath-Smith hired further staff, with many of these new hires working on the next entry. Originally intended as a spin-off and reworked during development as the next mainline entry, Tomb Raider III was released in 1998 for PlayStation and Windows. Alongside this, other team members began work on the fourth entry Tomb Raider: The Last Revelation (1999), intended as a means of killing off the character due to the workload and stress of developing the series.

During this period, Lara Croft also reached the height of her popularity as a character, appearing in advertisements and media crossovers, including an appearance in U2's 1997 PopMart Tour. A film adaptation was first proposed in 1996 and the film rights were acquired by Paramount Pictures in 1998. The adaptation was eventually released as Lara Croft: Tomb Raider in 2001 with Angelina Jolie in the titular role. The game has received a fan remake in Unreal Engine titled Tomb Raider: The Dagger of Xian, currently covering part of the opening level in the Great Wall.

References

Notes

Citations

External links

1997 video games
3D platform games
Android (operating system) games
Aspyr games
Cancelled Sega Saturn games
Classic Mac OS games
Core Design games
Eidos Interactive games
IOS games
PlayStation (console) games
PlayStation Network games
Single-player video games
Tibet in fiction
Tomb Raider games
Victor Interactive Software games
Video game sequels
Video games based on Chinese mythology
Video games scored by Nathan McCree
Video games set in 1997
Video games set in Alaska
Video games set in China
Video games set in Surrey
Video games set in the Las Vegas Valley
Video games set in Venice
Video games set in Tibet
Video games set on fictional islands
Video games with expansion packs
Windows games
Works set in opera houses
Video games developed in the United Kingdom
Westlake Interactive games
Video games about cults